Butthead may refer to: 

 Butt-Head, a fictional character from the animated TV series Beavis and Butt-Head
 Asshole
 Idiot

See also 
 :Category:Pejorative terms for people